Balignicourt is a commune in the Aube department in the Grand Est region of north-central France.

Geography
Balignicourt is located some 18 km north-west of Brienne-le-Château and 25 km south by south-west of Vitry-le-François. The northern border of the commune is the departmental boundary between Aube and Marne. Access to the commune is by the D56 from Jasseines in the west which passes through the south of the commune and the village before continuing east to Chavanges. The D156 goes north-east from the village to Margerie-Hancourt, changing to the D355 at the departmental border. Apart from the village there are the hamlets of Les Ormées, Vendeuil and Les Vieilles-Vignes. The commune is entirely farmland except for a belt of forest along the river.

The Meldançon river flows through the commune from east to west and continues west to join the Aube near Morembert.

Neighbouring communes and villages

Administration

List of Successive Mayors

Demography
In 2017 the commune had 61 inhabitants.

Culture and heritage

Religious heritage
The commune has two religious buildings that are registered as historical monuments:
A former Presbytery (18th century)
The Church of Saints Peter and Paul (12th century) The Church contains many items that are registered as historical objects:
2 Paintings: Saint John the Baptist and the Virgin of the Assumption (17th century)
A Group Sculpture: Christ bound with Angels and emblems (1549)
A Statue: Christ on the Cross (18th century)
A Paten (18th century)
A Collection Box (18th century)
A Wardrobe (18th century)
A Chalice (19th century)
A Door (1771)
A Baptismal font (16th century)
A Statue: Christ on the Cross (18th century)
4 Columns (17th century)
The Furniture in the Church
Stained glass figures (16th century)

Church Picture Gallery

Notable people linked to the commune

Charles Ragon de Bange (1833-1914), born in Balignicourt, invented the first effective obturator (valve closure) system for breech-loading artillery.

See also
Communes of the Aube department

References

External links
Balignicourt on the old National Geographic Institute website 
Balignicourt on Géoportail, National Geographic Institute (IGN) website 
Balignicourt on the 1750 Cassini Map

Communes of Aube